is a Japanese manga series written and illustrated by Shinobu Kaitani. It was first serialized in Kodansha's shōnen manga magazine Weekly Shōnen Magazine December 2015 to October 2016 and later on the Magazine Pocket manga application from June to October 2016.

Publication
Written and illustrated by Shinobu Kaitani, Muteki no Hito was serialized in Kodansha's Weekly Shōnen Magazine from December 22, 2015, to June 8, 2016. The series was later transferred to the Magazine Pocket manga application, where it ran from June 15 to October 5, 2016. Kodansha collected its chapters in four tankōbon volumes, released from March 17 to December 16, 2016.

Volume list

References

Further reading

External links
Muteki no Hito official website at Magamega 
 

Kodansha manga
Mahjong in anime and manga
Shōnen manga